Bucyrus-Erie was an American surface and underground mining equipment company. It was founded as Bucyrus Foundry and Manufacturing Company in Bucyrus, Ohio, in 1880. Bucyrus moved its headquarters to South Milwaukee, Wisconsin in 1893. In 1927, Bucyrus merged with the Erie Steam Shovel Company to form Bucyrus-Erie.

Renamed Bucyrus International, Inc., in 1997, it was purchased by Caterpillar in a US$7.6 billion ($8.6 billion including net debt) transaction that closed on July 8, 2011.  At the time of its acquisition, the Bucyrus product line included a range of material removal and material handling products used in both surface and underground mining.

History

1880-1927

Bucyrus was an early producer of steam shovels in its Bucyrus, Ohio headquarters and manufacturing facility. In 1893, Bucyrus moved its operations to South Milwaukee, Wisconsin.

In 1904 Bucyrus supplied 77 of the 102 steam shovels used to dig the Panama Canal. These were 95 ton models with five-cubic-yard buckets that could move approximately eight tons of material at once.  They were operated by a crew of four.  Similar to a locomotive, the crew was headed by an engineer, and included two firemen who stoked the boiler with coal, and a craneman.  A support crew of six on the ground laid rails on which the shovel moved.  A photograph of President Theodore Roosevelt was taken in November 1906 operating a Bucyrus shovel in Panama during his inspection trip.  In March 1910, a single Bucyrus shovel excavated 70,000 cubic yards in 26 days at the Culebra cut, setting a canal construction record.  Each shovel averaged over 1,000,000 cubic yards of earth excavated at the cut.

1927-1980

The company changed its name to Bucyrus-Erie in 1927 when it merged with the Erie Steam Shovel Company, the country's leading manufacturer of small excavators at that time.

In 1930 Bucyrus joined with Ruston & Hornsby Ltd Lincoln, England, forming the Ruston-Bucyrus Ltd firm in England. Ruston & Hornsby Ltd were the pre-eminent manufacturers of steam excavators at the time, having started in 1874. The merger gave the company access to previously unavailable world markets.

1980-2011

Ruston & Hornsby Ltd sold their share in Ruston-Bucyrus in 1985, during a period of recession and consolidation in the mining industry, as they divested non-core businesses to survive.

For a time in the 1980s the company was known as Becor Western following its merger with Western Gear.

On February 18, 1994, Bucyrus-Erie filed for Chapter 11 bankruptcy, and remained under bankruptcy protection until December 14, 1994.

The company adopted the name Bucyrus International, Inc. in 1997.

Bucyrus built hundreds of large mining machines, as well as construction equipment, competing with Marion Power Shovel. Bucyrus acquired Marion Power Shovel in 1997.

On May 4, 2007, Bucyrus completed the acquisition of the DBT Group, a Lunen, Germany-based manufacturer of underground mining equipment, from RAG Coal International AG of Herne, Germany. Bucyrus acquired DBT because DBT's underground mining equipment complemented Bucyrus' surface mining products.

In February 2010, Bucyrus International completed a US$1.3 billion acquisition of the mining equipment division of Terex Corporation.

On November 15, 2010, Bucyrus agreed to be acquired by Caterpillar in a transaction valued at US$8.6 billion. Caterpillar said it intended to create a new mining business headquarters at the former Bucyrus headquarters location in South Milwaukee. The transaction closed in mid-2011.

The Intellectual Property Rights for Bucyrus Erie marine cranes was acquired by Sparrows Group which has crane manufacturing operations based in Houston, Texas

Products
Bucyrus owned the Bucyrus, Bucyrus-Erie, Marion, and Ransomes & Rapier brands and provided OEM parts and support services for machinery which bears those brands.

Historical

 4250-W walking dragline, also known as Big Muskie, was built in 1969, with a  bucket and weighed 13,000 metric tons. Big Muskie's  bucket is currently near McConnellsville, Ohio in a small park dedicated to coal mining.
Ursa Major at Black Thunder Coal Mine was reported to be the third largest dragline ever built.
The Silver Spade was dismantled in 2007.
 The Stripping shovel Big Brutus, a 1850-B, was built in 1962, with a 90-yard bucket. It is in West Mineral, Kansas, as the centerpiece of a museum.
 The Bucyrus-Erie 50-R, 55 feet high and housing a massive drill, was responsible for the successful rescue of two miners during the 1963 Sheppton, Pennsylvania mining disaster.
 The 5-W walking dragline, carrying a  bucket and produced until around 1970.
 Marion Power Shovel Company of Marion, Ohio designed the crawler transporter used to carry Saturn V rockets and Space Shuttles to their launch pads.
 in 1946 an 1150RB walking dragline was transported to Britain as part of the Marshall Plan. It was used to remove overburden at various mines around the UK, lastly at St Aidan's opencast coal mine, Yorkshire, until the River Aire burst its banks and flooded the mine in March 1988. It has been preserved as a static monument at the site.

References

External links
 Official Website

 Bucyrus International SEC Filings

Manufacturing companies established in 1880
Companies formerly listed on the Nasdaq
Companies that filed for Chapter 11 bankruptcy in 1994
Construction equipment manufacturers of the United States
Manufacturing companies based in Wisconsin
Milwaukee County, Wisconsin
Mining equipment companies
Former Caterpillar Inc. subsidiaries
1880 establishments in Ohio
2011 mergers and acquisitions